Lyudmila Bezrukova (born April 24, 1945 in Luga) is a former Soviet sprint canoer who competed in the early 1970s. She won two medals at the 1970 ICF Canoe Sprint World Championships in Copenhagen with a gold in the K-4 500 m and a silver in the K-2 500 m events.

References

Profile at Sportbiography.ru 

Living people
1945 births
People from Luga, Leningrad Oblast
Soviet female canoeists
ICF Canoe Sprint World Championships medalists in kayak